The Cannone da 135/45 OTO 1937 was a 135 mm (5.3 in) 45-caliber naval gun built for the Regia Marina in the late 1930s. Built as a response to the French Canon de 138 mm Modèle 1929, it was meant to have the same range as the widespread 120 mm gun, but with less muzzle velocity and less dispersion.

Description
This gun was of loose barrel, jacket and bracket ring, with a horizontal, hand-operated sliding block. The mountings, all with individual cradles for each gun, were either triple (on battleships) or double, with electrical-powered ramming (which, however, was too weak for elevations above 30°, which therefore required hand loading, which rendered the gun unsuitable for anti-aircraft use).

The gun fired both AP and HE shells, all weighing 32.7 kg (72.1 lb), at a muzzle velocity of 825 M/S (2,707 F/S).

Service
The triple mountings were used on the s as a secondary battery (with each having four turrets); four double mountings each were fitted on the three completed s. Single shielded mounts were used to rearm the Premuda (captured Yugoslav destroyer Dubrovnik) and Spalato (captured Yugoslav destroyer Split) while others were built for the never completed aircraft carrier Aquila and s.  Studies for twin dual-purpose mountings were begun, intended for the two unfinished  cruisers and the salvaged battleship , but this work was still far from finished in 1943.

The gun proved successful (having only a quarter of the dispersion of the 120 mm gun); however, with the 45° maximum elevation and the limit for mechanical ramming being at 30°, it could not be used against aircraft.

After the war, when the light cruiser  was rebuilt in 1961 as a missile cruiser, its original 152 mm turrets were removed, and two new 135 mm double DP turrets were fitted.

See also

Weapons of comparable role, performance and era
 Canon de 138 mm Modèle 1929

Notes

Bibliography

External links
 135 mm/45 on NavWeaps.com

135 mm artillery
World War II naval weapons
World War II artillery of Italy
Naval guns of Italy